Doug Mountjoy (8 June 1942 – 14 February 2021) was a Welsh snooker player from Tir-y-Berth, Gelligaer, Wales. He was a member of the professional snooker circuit from the late 1970s and throughout the 1980s, and remained within the top 16 of the world rankings for 11 consecutive years. He began his professional snooker career by taking the 1977 Masters, which he entered as a reserve player. He won both the 1978 UK Championship and the 1979 Irish Masters. Mountjoy reached the final of the 1981 World Snooker Championship where he was defeated by Steve Davis. He was also runner-up at the 1985 Masters losing to Cliff Thorburn, but by 1988 he had dropped out of the top 16.

Mountjoy enjoyed a resurgence in his 40s, and at the age of 46 he defeated Stephen Hendry in the final of the 1988 UK Championship. He followed up by also winning the next ranking event, the 1989 Classic, and by the end of the 1988–89 season he was back in the top 16, where he remained until 1992. His world ranking peaked at number five in 1990–1991. He also won five Welsh Professional Championship titles during his career.

Diagnosed with lung cancer in 1993, Mountjoy qualified for the World Championship at the age of 50, just weeks before having a lung surgically removed. He continued to play professionally until 1997, and he was coach to the United Arab Emirates snooker association between 1997 and 1999 and appeared sporadically at the World Snooker Championship until 2002. Mountjoy died in February 2021 after a stroke.

Early life 
Mountjoy was born on 8 June 1942, in Tir-y-Berth, Gelligaer, Glamorgan, Wales. He was brought up just outside Ebbw Vale and worked for some years as a coal miner, playing snooker in his spare time. A popular player in the South Wales Valleys as a junior, he won many amateur tournaments including two Welsh Amateur titles and the World Amateur title in 1976, after defeating Paul Mifsud 11–1. After the World Amateur victory he turned professional at the age of 34.

Career 
Mountjoy's first professional tournament, which he entered as a late replacement, was the 1977 Masters at the New London Theatre. After defeating former world champions John Pulman, Fred Davis, and Alex Higgins to reach the final, he beat the defending Masters champion and reigning world champion Ray Reardon 7–6 to win the title.

At the 1977 World Championship a couple of months later, he defeated Higgins again in the first round but lost to Dennis Taylor in the quarter-final 11–13. At the end of 1977, he reached the final of the first UK Snooker Championship, losing to Patsy Fagan 9–12. He won the title at the 1978 UK Championship, however, beating David Taylor 15–9, and he defeated Ray Reardon in the same season to win the Irish Masters 6–5. He won the 1980 Champion of Champions, with a 10–8 victory over John Virgo in the final. Mountjoy also won the 1978 Pot Black event.

After being part of the winning Wales team in the first two snooker World Challenge Cups, in 1979 and 1980, and winning the 1980 Welsh Professional Championship he had an attack of Bell's palsy which partially paralysed his face. Recovering from the attack, he reached the final of the 1981 World Championship, defeating Eddie Charlton, Dennis Taylor and, in the semi-final, Ray Reardon (against whom he made a 145 break, a championship record at the time). He then played Steve Davis in the final. Davis was favourite to win his first world title, and appeared to be racing to an easy victory by winning the first six frames of the match. However, Mountjoy recovered and came close to drawing level on several occasions. Trailing 11–13, and with the score at 60–63 in the 25th frame, he looked certain to cut Davis's lead to one frame but missed a simple blue from its spot; Davis went on to clear the colours,  the final black. Mountjoy won only one more frame as Davis won the match 18–12.

After that run at the World Championship, he had only a short run of titles; he won the Welsh Professional Championship in 1982 and 1984 to go with his 1980 title. He was back in the final of a major again in the 1985 Masters tournament, losing to Cliff Thorburn 9–6. Mountjoy also reclaimed the Pot Black title in March that year.

He won another Welsh title in 1987 but otherwise struggled to regain his previous form, including a 1–9 defeat to Steve Longworth in the first round of the 1986 UK Championship. By 1988 he was out of the top 16 in the world rankings. In the 1988–89 snooker season, however, he reached the final of the 1988 UK Championship where he met Stephen Hendry. He won 16–12 and gained his first ranking tournament victory, having at one stage scored centuries in three consecutive frames. In January 1989 he won the Classic, beating fellow Welshman Wayne Jones in the final, to win consecutive ranking titles. This was enough for him to return to the top 16 the next season, and by 1990 he was number five in the world. He remained in the top 16 until 1992.

Mountjoy was diagnosed with lung cancer in 1993, having been a smoker for many years. That year, at the age of 50, he defeated Alain Robidoux 10–6 in the first round of the World Championship, only weeks before an operation to remove his left lung. This was his last appearance in the final stages of the championship and for fifteen years he was the last player aged over 50 to appear at The Crucible. He survived the cancer and continued to play snooker until 1997, after which he concentrated on snooker coaching. He would coach in the United Arab Emirates, but did appear in qualifying for the 2002 World Snooker Championship.

Death 
Mountjoy died on 14 February 2021, at the age of 78 after a stroke. In a joint statement, World Snooker chairman Barry Hearn and World Professional Billiards and Snooker Association chairman Jason Ferguson said: "Doug was first and foremost a lovely man, who had great friendships with many players on the tour throughout the 1970s and onwards."

Performance and rankings timeline

Career finals

Ranking finals: 4 (2 titles)

Non-ranking finals: 28 (15 titles)

Pro-am finals: 4 (2 titles)

Team finals: 5 (2 titles)

Amateur finals: 4 (3 titles)

References

External links
Profile on Global Snooker

1942 births
2021 deaths
Masters (snooker) champions
People from Gelligaer
Sportspeople from Caerphilly County Borough
Welsh snooker players
Sportspeople from Ebbw Vale
UK champions (snooker)
Place of death missing